In geometry, a pentahedron (plural: pentahedra) is a polyhedron with five faces or sides. There are no face-transitive polyhedra with five sides and there are two distinct topological types.

With regular polygon faces, the two topological forms are the square pyramid and triangular prism.

The square pyramid can be seen as a triangular prism where one of its side edges (joining two squares) is collapsed into a point, losing one edge and one vertex, and changing two squares into triangles.

Geometric variations with irregular faces can also be constructed.

Some irregular pentahedra with six vertices may be called wedges.

An irregular pentahedron can be a non-convex solid: Consider a non-convex (planar) quadrilateral (such as a dart) as the base of the solid, and any point not in the base plane as the apex.

Hosohedron
There is a third topological polyhedral figure with 5 faces, degenerate as a polyhedron: it exists as a spherical tiling of digon faces, called a pentagonal hosohedron with Schläfli symbol {2,5}. It has 2 (antipodal point) vertices, 5 edges, and 5 digonal faces.

External links

Polyhedra